Wang Manyu (born 9 February 1999) is a Chinese table tennis player. She is the current world champion in women's singles and doubles. In the 2017 T2 Asia Pacific League, she replaced Ding Ning in round 2 for team Persson.

2018 began with Wang Manyu defeating world number one Chen Meng in the Hungarian Open Quarterfinals before going on to win the championship with wins against Chen Xingtong in the semi-finals and Sun Yingsha in the finals. In March, Wang Manyu was selected for the 2018 World Team Table Tennis Championships women's team after placing second in the team qualifiers. After a successful WTTC, Wang defeated Chen Xingtong in the Hong Kong Open women's singles final followed by victory against Ding Ning in the China Open women's singles final.

Career

2021
In May, Wang was selected as a reserve for the Chinese National Team at the 2020 Tokyo Olympics. Shortly after, she won the second leg of the Chinese Olympic Scrimmage, defeating Olympic women's singles representatives Chen Meng and Sun Yingsha in the process. Wang again beat both Chen and Sun in a closed-door scrimmage in June.

Wang Manyu played in the team event of the Tokyo Olympics because of Liu Shiwen's withdrawal due to an elbow injury. Wang and her team scored a 3-0 victory over Japan to win gold and continuing China's undefeated streak in the Women's team event.

In September, Wang reached the quarter-finals of the China National Games after a tiring win against chopper Liu Fei. Despite getting injured the day before the semi-finals and finals, Wang defeated both Olympic finalists Chen Meng and Sun Yingsha 4-0 the next day to win the women's singles gold medal.

Singles titles

References

External links

1999 births
Living people
Chinese female table tennis players
Table tennis players from Heilongjiang
Sportspeople from Qiqihar
Asian Games medalists in table tennis
Table tennis players at the 2018 Asian Games
Asian Games gold medalists for China
Asian Games silver medalists for China
Medalists at the 2018 Asian Games
World Table Tennis Championships medalists
Table tennis players at the 2020 Summer Olympics
Olympic gold medalists for China
Olympic medalists in table tennis
Medalists at the 2020 Summer Olympics
Olympic table tennis players of China
21st-century Chinese women